George Edward Rettger   (July 29, 1868 – June 5, 1921) was a 19th-century Major League Baseball pitcher.

External links
Baseball Reference – major league statistics

19th-century baseball players
Major League Baseball pitchers
St. Louis Browns (AA) players
Cleveland Spiders players
Cincinnati Reds players
Baseball players from Ohio
1868 births
1921 deaths
Evansville Hoosiers players
Minneapolis Millers (baseball) players
Atlanta Windjammers players
Milwaukee Brewers (minor league) players
Toledo White Stockings players
Milwaukee Creams players
Columbus Senators players
Kansas City Blues (baseball) players